Gaspar Ávila Rodríguez (born 6 January 1946) is a Mexican politician affiliated with the Institutional Revolutionary Party. As of 2014 he served as Deputy of the LVI and LIX Legislatures of the Mexican Congress representing the State of Mexico.

References

1946 births
Living people
Politicians from the State of Mexico
Institutional Revolutionary Party politicians
Deputies of the LIX Legislature of Mexico
Members of the Chamber of Deputies (Mexico) for the State of Mexico